Melbourne Aerodrome , a private airport, is located adjacent to Melbourne, Ontario, Canada.

References

Registered aerodromes in Ontario